Bad Waitress is a Canadian punk rock band from Toronto, Ontario. The band is signed with Royal Mountain Records.

Background and career 
Bad Waitress began under the moniker the Nude Dogs. They released their first EP as the Nude Dogs in 2017, before changing their name and the band's lineup. In 2018, they released their first EP as Bad Waitress, Party Bangers: Volume 1. In 2021, they released their first full length LP titled No Taste.

Members 

 Kali-Ann Butala (vocals and guitar)
 Katelyn Molgard (guitar)
 Eva Moon (drums)
 Nicole Cain (bass)

Discography

LPs 

 No Taste (2021)

EPs  

 Party Bangers: Volume 1 (2018)

Singles 

 Acid Brain (2018)
 That Sedative (2020)
 Pre Post-Period Blues (2021)
 Too Many Bad Habits (2021)
 Manners (2021)

References 

Musical groups from Toronto
Canadian punk rock groups
Musical groups established in 2016